Jack Sinclair served as the President and International Commissioner of Scouts Canada.
In 2004, Sinclair was awarded the 302nd Bronze Wolf, the only distinction of the World Organization of the Scout Movement, awarded by the World Scout Committee for exceptional services to world Scouting.

References

External links

Recipients of the Bronze Wolf Award
Year of birth missing
Scouting and Guiding in Canada